Duhat can refer to:
The tree or fruit of Syzygium jambolanum
The following places in the Philippines:
Duhat, Cavinti, Laguna Province
Duhat, Padre Burgos, Quezon Province
Duhat, Plaridel, Quezon Province
Duhat, Santa Cruz, Laguna Province
Duhat, Bocaue, Bulacan Province